Worthing United Football Club is a football club based in Worthing, England.

History
The club, originally called Wigmore Athletic, were one of the founder members of Division Two of the Sussex County Football League for the 1952–53 season. The first season in the league brought instant success as they finished as Champions and gained promotion to Division One. The club then spent the next thirteen seasons in Division one during which time they won the league cup in the 1959–60 season. This period also saw the club make their debut in the FA Cup, where they met Arundel in the Preliminary qualifying round, but were beaten 4–0. At the end of the thirteen seasons in Division One, the club was relegated to Division Two, but after two seasons were back in Division One. However, the club was immediately relegated again, and they had to wait until the end of the 1973–74 campaign to get back in the top Division, when they finished as Champions of Division Two. The club competed in Division one for four seasons before being relegated to Division Two where they stayed until the end of the 1987–88 Campaign.

At the end of the 1987–88 campaign, Wigmore Athletic were relegated to Division Three of the Sussex County league. The club's name changed to Worthing United when they amalgamated with local side Southdown FC. The newly named club took two seasons to escape from Division Three, when they gained promotion back to Division two as Champions. The club then spent the next fourteen seasons in Division Two, with the final of these fourteen seeing the club gain promotion back into Division One as runners-up in the 2003–04 season.

The club remained in Division One until the end of the 2008–09 campaign when they finished bottom of the division and found themselves back in Division Two. They won promotion back to Division One in the 2010–11 season under manager Dominic Di Paola.

In January 2013, Worthing United appointed Paul Curtis as their manager. In November 2013, John Foley was appointed as his replacement, and George Bish took up his duties as the assistant manager.  Despite their best efforts, they were unable to turn the club's fortunes around and ended up seeing the club relegated back to Division Two. This season, Malcolm Gamlen, the club secretary for over 20 years, died.

June 2014 saw another managerial change with Nigel Geary replacing John Foley. In his first year at the helm, Geary guided the club back to the new 'premier division' formally known as division one, after winning the league and cup double.

In August 2015, two of the team's players, Matthew Grimstone and Jacob Schilt, were among those killed when an aircraft crashed on the A27 road near Shoreham Airport. They were driving to the Robert Albon Memorial ground to participate in a match against Loxwood F.C., which was consequently called off.

Ground

Worthing United play their home games at the Robert Albon Memorial Ground, Lyons Way, Worthing, West Sussex, BN14 9JF.

Honours

League honours
Sussex County Football League Division Two:
 Winners (3): 1952–53, 1973–74, 2014–15
 Runners-up (3): 1967–68, 2003–04, 2009–10
Sussex County Football League Division Three:
 Winners (1): 1989–90

Cup honours
Sussex County Football League John O'Hara League Challenge Cup:
 Winners (2): 1959–60, 1974–75
 Runners-up (2): 1956–57, 1975–76
Sussex County Football League Division Two League Cup:
 Winners (2): 1967–68, 2014–15 
 Runners-up (3): 1983–84, 1995–96, 2003–04

Records

Highest league position: 3rd in Sussex County Football League Division One 1974–75
FA Cup best performance: Third qualifying round 2006–07
FA Vase best performance: Third round 1991–92

References

External links

Southern Combination Football League
Football clubs in West Sussex
Sport in Worthing
Association football clubs established in 1952
1952 establishments in England
Football clubs in England